Paul Michael Gross OC (born April 30, 1959) is a Canadian actor, director, writer, producer, and musician born in Calgary, Alberta.

Gross is known for his lead role as Constable Benton Fraser in the popular Canadian television series Due South as well as for his 2008 war film Passchendaele, which he wrote, produced, directed, and starred in. Gross acted as executive producer on Due South and in addition to starring, wrote seven episodes including the two-part series finale, and wrote and sang songs for the soundtrack of the series. He later found success with another Canadian television series, Slings & Arrows and Republic of Doyle.

Early life
Gross was born in Calgary, Alberta, the son of Renie Gross (née Dunne), a writer and art historian, and Robert "Bob" Gross, a career soldier, colonel, and tank commander. His family moved to Arlington, Virginia in his adolescence, where Gross attended Yorktown High School. He credits drama teacher Timothy Jecko as his inspiration for becoming an actor: "I'm not sure where I would have ended up otherwise."

Career
Gross studied acting at the University of Alberta in Edmonton, but he left during the third year of his study. He went back later to complete the half-credit needed to receive his fine arts degree.  He appeared in several stage productions, such as Hamlet and Romeo and Juliet. Other productions in which he appeared include Observe the Sons of Ulster Marching Towards the Somme and As You Like It. His student work The Deer and the Antelope Play was co-produced by the university’s department of drama and Theatre Network, and won both the Clifford E. Lee National Playwriting Award and the Alberta Culture Playwriting Award.

After the play Successful Strangers, Gross starred in his first movie, Turning to Stone.

He wrote and directed the curling movie Men with Brooms. Gross starred in the television series Slings & Arrows from 2003 to 2006 alongside his wife Martha Burns, which The A.V. Club called "one of TV's greatest shows".

In 2008, he attracted widespread attention in Canada when he wrote, co-produced, directed, and starred in the Genie Award-winning film Passchendaele, inspired by stories he heard from his grandfather, a First World War soldier. The film had its premiere at the 2008 Toronto International Film Festival on September 4, 2008, when it also had the honour of opening the festival. The film received a mixed reception upon release.
 Despite this, it won several awards; namely five awards the 29th Genie Awards, including Best Picture, and the Golden Reel Award for Canada's top-grossing film of 2008. On March 2, 2009, Paul Gross was honoured for his film Passchendaele, winning that year's National Arts Centre Award for achievement over the past performance year.

From September 16, 2011, he appeared in a production of Noël Coward's Private Lives in Toronto co-starring Kim Cattrall (the production ended October 30, 2011); the production moved to Broadway where it opened November 6, and closed on December 31, 2011. That year, he also produced a feature film with Akshay Kumar called Breakaway starring Camilla Belle and Vinay Virmani.

Between 2011 and 2014, he appeared in 9 episodes as Kevin Crocker on Republic of Doyle.

More recently, Gross completed work on the contemporary war drama Hyena Road, released on October 9, 2015.

According to the Stratford Festival of Canada web site (www.stratfordfestival.ca), Gross will be starring in the title role of King Lear during the 2023 season.

Due South
His role as upright Royal Canadian Mounted Police officer Benton Fraser in the Due South television series (1994–1999) brought him increased recognition. Like fellow actor David Marciano, he didn't want to do the show at first, and creator Paul Haggis didn't even know if he wanted Gross for the role, but following a meeting, he was cast as Constable Benton Fraser.

When Due South was revived for the third season, Gross returned in the role of Benton Fraser. He also took on duties as executive producer and writer. He earned an estimated salary of $2–3 million per season, and at the time was the highest-paid performer in Canadian television history. He wrote several episodes of the last season of the series. His favourite episodes include "Gift of the Wheelman" and "All the Queen's Horses" and his episodes "Mountie on the Bounty" and "Call of the Wild" are of a similar style.

Personal life
In September 1988, Gross married Canadian actress Martha Burns. The couple have two children, Hannah Gross, who is also an actress, and Jack Gross.

Theatre

Filmography

Films

Television

Honours

Awards

Discography

Albums

Singles

References

External links
 
 
 Watch Remembrance, a vignette on Paul Gross for his Governor General's Performing Arts Award.
 PaulGross.org
 Paul Gross at Northern Stars

Officers of the Order of Canada
1959 births
Living people
Canadian male television actors
Canadian television writers
Canadian television producers
Canadian male film actors
Film producers from Alberta
21st-century Canadian screenwriters
Canadian male screenwriters
Canadian male stage actors
Dora Mavor Moore Award winners
Best Actor in a Drama Series Canadian Screen Award winners
University of Alberta alumni
Film directors from Calgary
Male actors from Calgary
Writers from Calgary
Governor General's Performing Arts Award winners
20th-century Canadian male actors
21st-century Canadian male actors
Canadian male television writers
Canadian Comedy Award winners